The Clewiston Museum is located at 109 Central Avenue, Clewiston, Florida. It houses exhibits highlighting the local area, including: Fossils, Sugar, Cattle Industry First, Commercial Fishing, Flying Brits, Killer Hurricanes and Seminole Indians. The museum also has a 60-seat theater showing videos on history and agriculture. It features an extensive display on sugar planting, harvesting, and processing.

See also 

 Dixie Crystal Theatre

Notes

External links
Clewiston Museum (official website)

History museums in Florida
Museums in Hendry County, Florida
Native American museums in Florida